Marcelino Nicolas Lopez (born May 6, 1986) is an Argentine professional boxer. He held the WBC Latino lightweight title.

Professional career 
On May 28, 2010 Lopez won vacant WBC Latino Lightweight title against Alberto Leopoldo Santillan.

On August 23, Lopez won Argentina (FAB) lightweight title against Sergio Gonzalez.

On January 27, 2018 Nino won by TKO over Breidis Prescott, dropped Prescott in the fifth round before repeating job and seeing the Colombian stay down for the ten count.

Professional boxing record

References

External links 

1986 births
Living people
Argentine male boxers
Lightweight boxers
Light-welterweight boxers
Boxers from Buenos Aires